The 2010–11 Minnesota Timberwolves season was the 22nd season of the franchise in the National Basketball Association (NBA).

Key dates
 June 24, 2010 – The 2010 NBA draft was held in New York City.
 July 1, 2010  – The free agency period began.
 October 26, 2010  –  Regular season began.
 December 25, 2010  – Christmas Day
 February 20, 2011  –  2011 NBA All-Star Game
 April 13, 2011 – Regular season ended
 April 16, 2011 – 2011 NBA Playoffs
 May 31, 2011 – 2011 NBA Finals

Summary

NBA draft 2010

Roster

Pre-season

Game log

|- bgcolor="#ccffcc"
| 1
| October 4
| L.A. Lakers
| 
| Martell Webster (24)
| Kevin Love (8)
| Luke Ridnour (7)
| O2 Arena18,689
| 1–0
|- bgcolor="#ccffcc"
| 2
| October 6
| New York
| 
| Kevin Love,Martell Webster (17)
| Kevin Love (14)
| Sebastian Telfair (4)
| Palais Omnisports de Paris-Bercy15,532
| 2–0
|- bgcolor="#ccffcc"
| 3
| October 12
| Denver
| 
| Michael Beasley (21)
| Kevin Love (15)
| Sebastian Telfair (8)
| Target Center8,718
| 3–0
|- bgcolor="#ffcccc"
| 4
| October 13
| @ Indiana
| 
| Luke Ridnour (11)
| Kevin Love (9)
| Sebastian Telfair (3)
| Conseco Fieldhouse9,177
| 3–1
|- bgcolor="#ccffcc"
| 5
| October 15
| Detroit
| 
| Kevin Love (21)
| Kevin Love (10)
| Sebastian Telfair (7)
| Carrier Dome11,747
| 4–1
|- bgcolor="#ccffcc"
| 6
| October 17
| Milwaukee
| 
| Kevin Love (32)
| Kevin Love (13)
| Luke Ridnour (7)
| Sioux Falls Arena5,102
| 5–1
|- bgcolor="#ffcccc"
| 7
| October 19
| Indiana
| 
| Kevin Love (28)
| Kevin Love (11)
| Sebastian Telfair (6)
| Target Center10,918
| 5–2
|- bgcolor="#ccffcc"
| 8
| October 22
| @ Milwaukee
| 
| Luke Ridnour (17)
| Darko Miličić (10)
| Luke Ridnour (7)
| Bradley Center11,624
| 6–2
|-

Regular season

Standings

Game log

|- bgcolor="#ffcccc"
| 1
| October 27
| Sacramento
| 
| Luke Ridnour (20)
| Kevin Love (10)
| Luke Ridnour,Sebastian Telfair (6)
| Target Center17,067
| 0–1
|- bgcolor="#ccffcc"
| 2
| October 29    
| Milwaukee
| 
| Michael Beasley (21)
| Kevin Love (16)
| Luke Ridnour (7)
| Target Center17,197
| 1–1
|- bgcolor="#ffcccc"
| 3
| October 30
| @ Memphis
| 
| Wayne Ellington (15)
| Kevin Love (13)
| Luke Ridnour (3)
| FedExForum12,753
| 1–2
|-

|- bgcolor="#ffcccc"
| 4
| November 2
| @ Miami
| 
| Kevin Love (20)
| Nikola Peković (8)
| Wesley Johnson (5)
| American Airlines Arena19,600
| 1–3
|- bgcolor="#ffcccc"
| 5
| November 3
| @ Orlando
| 
| Kevin Love (22)
| Kevin Love (9)
| Sebastian Telfair (5)
| Amway Center18,846
| 1–4
|- bgcolor="#ffcccc"
| 6
| November 5
| Atlanta
| 
| Kevin Love,Corey Brewer,Wesley Johnson (18)
| Kevin Love (12)
| Sebastian Telfair (7)
| Target Center17.222
| 1–5
|- bgcolor="#ffcccc"
| 7
| November 7
| @ Houston
| 
| Kevin Love (16)
| Kevin Love (16)
| Corey Brewer (3)
| Toyota Center15,058
| 1–6
|- bgcolor="#ffcccc"
| 8
| November 9
| @ L.A. Lakers
| 
| Kevin Love (23)
| Kevin Love (24)
| Sebastian Telfair (9)
| Staples Center18,997
| 1–7
|- bgcolor="#ccffcc"
| 9
| November 10
| @ Sacramento
| 
| Michael Beasley (42)
| Michael Beasley,Kevin Love (9)
| Darko Miličić (4)
| ARCO Arena12,433
| 2–7
|- bgcolor="#ccffcc"
| 10
| November 12
| New York
| 
| Michael Beasley (35)
| Kevin Love (31)
| Sebastian Telfair (8)
| Target Center15,232
| 3–7
|- bgcolor="#ffcccc"
| 11
| November 14
| @ Atlanta
| 
| Michael Beasley (25)
| Kevin Love (17)
| Sebastian Telfair (8)
| Philips Arena12,027
| 3–8
|- bgcolor="#ffcccc"
| 12
| November 15
| @ Charlotte
| 
| Michael Beasley (28)
| Darko Miličić (12)
| Sebastian Telfair (6)
| Time Warner Cable Arena11,211
| 3–9
|- bgcolor="#ccffcc"
| 13
| November 17
| L.A. Clippers
| 
| Michael Beasley (33)
| Kevin Love (14)
| Luke Ridnour (8)
| Target Center12,909
| 4–9
|- bgcolor="#ffcccc"
| 14
| November 19
| L.A. Lakers
| 
| Michael Beasley (25)
| Darko Miličić (16)
| Darko Miličić (5)
| Target Center19,356
| 4–10
|- bgcolor="#ffcccc"
| 15
| November 22
| @ Oklahoma City
| 
| Kevin Love (24)
| Kevin Love (17)
| Luke Ridnour (7)
| Oklahoma City Arena17,653
| 4–11
|- bgcolor="#ffcccc"
| 16
| November 24
| San Antonio
| 
| Kevin Love (32)
| Kevin Love (22)
| Luke Ridnour,Sebastian Telfair (5)
| Target Center13,117
| 4–12
|- bgcolor="#ffcccc"
| 17
| November 27
| Golden State
| 
| Michael Beasley (28)
| Kevin Love (22)
| Luke Ridnour (6)
| Target Center14,440
| 4–13
|-

|- bgcolor="#ffcccc"
| 18
| December 1
| @ Dallas
| 
| Michael Beasley (16)
| Kevin Love (15)
| Kevin Love,Darko Miličić,Luke Ridnour (3)
| American Airlines Center19,567
| 4–14
|- bgcolor="#ffcccc"
| 19
| December 3
| @ San Antonio
| 
| Michael Beasley (28)
| Kevin Love (18)
| Darko Miličić (4)
| AT&T Center18,581
| 4–15
|- bgcolor="#ccffcc"
| 20
| December 4
| Cleveland
| 
| Kevin Love (28)
| Kevin Love (19)
| Sebastian Telfair (7)
| Target Center14,422
| 5–15
|- bgcolor="#ffcccc"
| 21
| December 6
| @ New York
| 
| Kevin Love (33)
| Kevin Love (15)
| Luke Ridnour (4)
| Madison Square Garden19,763
| 5–16
|- bgcolor="#ffcccc"
| 22
| December 8
| Oklahoma City
| 
| Michael Beasley (26)
| Kevin Love (21)
| Luke Ridnour (9)
| Target Center13,907
| 5–17
|- bgcolor="#ccffcc"
| 23
| December 10
| Detroit
| 
| Kevin Love (27)
| Kevin Love (18)
| Luke Ridnour (10)
| Target Center13,988
| 6–17
|- bgcolor="#ffcccc"
| 24
| December 11
| @ Chicago
| 
| Kevin Love (23)
| Kevin Love (15)
| Luke Ridnour (8)
| United Center21,102
| 6–18
|- bgcolor="#ffcccc"
| 25
| December 14
| @ Golden State
| 
| Darko Miličić (25)
| Kevin Love (14)
| Luke Ridnour (11)
| Oracle Arena17,615
| 6–19
|- bgcolor="#ffcccc"
| 26
| December 15
| @ Phoenix
| 
| Kevin Love (23)
| Kevin Love (16)
| Luke Ridnour (8)
| US Airways Center16,977
| 6–20
|- bgcolor="#ffcccc"
| 27
| December 17
| @ Portland
| 
| Michael Beasley (33)
| Kevin Love (17)
| Kevin Love (4)
| Rose Garden20,310
| 6–21
|- bgcolor="#ffcccc"
| 28
| December 18
| @ Denver
| 
| Kevin Love (43)
| Kevin Love (17)
| Luke Ridnour (5)
| Pepsi Center15,409
| 6–22
|- bgcolor="#ffcccc"
| 29
| December 20
| @ L.A. Clippers
| 
| Michael Beasley (20)
| Kevin Love (10)
| Luke Ridnour (6)
| Staples Center16,053
| 6–23
|- bgcolor="#ffcccc"
| 30
| December 22
| Utah
| 
| Kevin Love (25)
| Kevin Love (19)
| Luke Ridnour (5)
| Target Center15,809
| 6–24
|- bgcolor="#ccffcc"
| 31
| December 26
| @ Cleveland
| 
| Michael Beasley (28)
| Kevin Love (18)
| Luke Ridnour (6)
| Quicken Loans Arena20,562
| 7–24
|- bgcolor="#ccffcc"
| 32
| December 27
| New Orleans
| 
| Michael Beasley (30)
| Kevin Love (11)
| Luke Ridnour (11)
| Target Center11,679
| 8–24
|- bgcolor="#ffcccc"
| 33
| December 29
| Denver
| 
| Michael Beasley (33)
| Kevin Love (14)
| Luke Ridnour (8)
| Target Center17,093
| 8–25
|-

|- bgcolor="#ccffcc"
| 34
| January 1
| New Jersey
| 
| Kevin Love (23)
| Kevin Love (10)
| Luke Ridnour (6)
| Target Center12,665
| 9–25
|- bgcolor="#ffcccc"
| 35
| January 3
| @ Boston
| 
| Michael Beasley (19)
| Kevin Love (24)
| Luke Ridnour (5)
| TD Garden18,624
| 9–26
|- bgcolor="#ffcccc"
| 36
| January 5
| Charlotte
| 
| Kevin Love (35)
| Kevin Love (15)
| Kevin Love (5)
| Target Center14,881
| 9–27
|- bgcolor="#ffcccc"
| 37
| January 7
| Portland
| 
| Kevin Love (30)
| Kevin Love (19)
| Luke Ridnour (11)
| Target Center12,213
| 9–28
|- bgcolor="#ffcccc"
| 38
| January 9
| @ San Antonio
| 
| Kevin Love (18)
| Kevin Love (17)
| Luke Ridnour (7)
| AT&T Center18,581
| 9–29
|- bgcolor="#ffcccc"
| 39
| January 11
| San Antonio
| 
| Kevin Love (20)
| Kevin Love (20)
| Luke Ridnour (9)
| Target Center11,209
| 9–30
|- bgcolor="#ccffcc"
| 40
| January 13
| Washington
| 
| Kevin Love (35)
| Kevin Love,Darko Miličić (11)
| Luke Ridnour (9)
| Target Center11,437
| 10–30
|- bgcolor="#ffcccc"
| 41
| January 15
| Orlando
| 
| Corey Brewer (23)
| Kevin Love (15)
| Luke Ridnour (6)
| Target Center17,391
| 10–31
|- bgcolor="#ffcccc"
| 42
| January 17
| @ Portland
| 
| Kevin Love,Darko Miličić (22)
| Kevin Love (17)
| Luke Ridnour (6)
| Rose Garden20,239
| 10–32
|- bgcolor="#ffcccc"
| 43
| January 19
| @ L.A. Clippers
| 
| Kevin Love (26)
| Kevin Love (11)
| Jonny Flynn (6)
| Staples Center17,793
| 10–33
|- bgcolor="#ffcccc"
| 44
| January 24
| Houston
| 
| Kevin Love (24)
| Kevin Love (17)
| Kevin Love (7)
| Target Center11,983
| 10–34
|- bgcolor="#ffcccc"
| 45
| January 26
| Oklahoma City
| 
| Kevin Love (31)
| Kevin Love (21)
| Luke Ridnour (8)
| Target Center14,979
| 10–35
|- bgcolor="#ffcccc"
| 46
| January 28
| @ Utah
| 
| Kevin Love (22)
| Kevin Love (15)
| Jonny Flynn (6)
| EnergySolutions Arena19,911
| 10–36
|- bgcolor="ccffcc"
| 47
| January 29
| Toronto
| 
| Kevin Love (21)
| Kevin Love (12)
| Jonny Flynn (8)
| Target Center14,991
| 11–36
|-

|- bgcolor="#ffcccc"
| 48
| February 2
| Memphis
| 
| Michael Beasley (19)
| Kevin Love (10)
| Jonny Flynn,Sebastian Telfair (5)
| Target Center12,662
| 11–37
|- bgcolor="#ffcccc"
| 49
| February 4
| @ Toronto
| 
| Kevin Love (20)
| Kevin Love (15)
| Jonny Flynn (7)
| Air Canada Centre14,389
| 11–38
|- bgcolor="#ffcccc"
| 50
| February 5
| Denver
| 
| Michael Beasley (23)
| Kevin Love (19)
| Michael Beasley,Corey Brewer (5)
| Target Center15,389
| 11–39
|- bgcolor="#ccffcc"
| 51
| February 7
| @ New Orleans
| 
| Kevin Love (27)
| Kevin Love (17)
| Jonny Flynn (6)
| New Orleans Arena13,401
| 12–39
|- bgcolor="#ccffcc"
| 52
| February 8
| @ Houston
| 
| Kevin Love (20)
| Kevin Love (14)
| Jonny Flynn (7)
| Toyota Center15,679
| 13–39
|- bgcolor="#ffcccc"
| 53
| February 11
| @ Indiana
| 
| Kevin Love (22)
| Kevin Love (15)
| Sebastian Telfair (4)
| Conseco Fieldhouse12,559
| 13–40
|- bgcolor="#ffcccc"
| 54
| February 12
| Philadelphia
| 
| Kevin Love (16)
| Kevin Love (13)
| Luke Ridnour (5)
| Target Center17,011
| 13–41
|- bgcolor="#ffcccc"
| 55
| February 14
| Portland
| 
| Martell Webster (17)
| Kevin Love (11)
| Wayne Ellington (5)
| Target Center11,227
| 13–42
|- bgcolor="#ffcccc"
| 56
| February 16
| L.A. Clippers
| 
| Wayne Ellington,Kevin Love (18)
| Kevin Love (18)
| Sebastian Telfair (5)
| Target Center15,227
| 13–43
|- align="center"
|colspan="9" bgcolor="#bbcaff"|All-Star Break
|- bgcolor="#ffcccc"
| 57
| February 22
| @ Milwaukee
| 
| Michael Beasley (21)
| Kevin Love (17)
| Kevin Love (6)
| Bradley Center13,106
| 13–44
|- bgcolor="#ffcccc"
| 58
| February 23
| Memphis
| 
| Wayne Ellington (16)
| Kevin Love (11)
| Luke Ridnour (5)
| Target Center11,497
| 13–45
|- bgcolor="#ffcccc"
| 59
| February 25
| New Orleans
| 
| Wesley Johnson,Luke Ridnour (22)
| Kevin Love (14)
| Kevin Love (5)
| Target Center16,965
| 13–46
|- bgcolor="#ccffcc"
| 60
| February 27
| Golden State
| 
| Kevin Love (37)
| Kevin Love (23)
| Jonny Flynn (9)
| Target Center16,021
| 14–46
|-

|- bgcolor="#ffcccc"
| 61
| March 1
| L.A. Lakers
| 
| Wesley Johnson (20)
| Kevin Love (11)
| Jonny Flynn,Luke Ridnour (5)
| Target Center17,111
| 14–47
|- bgcolor="#ccffcc"
| 62
| March 2
| @ Detroit
| 
| Kevin Love (20)
| Kevin Love (20)
| Jonny Flynn (14)
| The Palace of Auburn Hills13,122
| 15–47
|- bgcolor="#ffcccc"
| 63
| March 4
| @ Philadelphia
| 
| Kevin Love (21)
| Kevin Love (23)
| Luke Ridnour (10)
| Wells Fargo Center12,008
| 15–48
|- bgcolor="#ffcccc"
| 64
| March 5
| @ Washington
| 
| Kevin Love (20)
| Kevin Love (21)
| Luke Ridnour (6)
| Verizon Center18,216
| 15–49
|- bgcolor="#ffcccc"
| 65
| March 7
| Dallas
| 
| Kevin Love (23)
| Kevin Love (17)
| Kevin Love (5)
| Target Center13,288
| 15–50
|- bgcolor="#ccffcc"
| 66
| March 9
| Indiana
| 
| Michael Beasley,Kevin Love (16)
| Kevin Love (21)
| Jonny Flynn (6)
| Target Center15,153
| 16–50
|- bgcolor="#ccffcc"
| 67
| March 11
| Utah
| 
| Kevin Love (24)
| Kevin Love (12)
| Luke Ridnour (7)
| Target Center18,534
| 17–50
|- bgcolor="#ffcccc"
| 68
| March 13
| @ Golden State
| 
| Michael Beasley,Martell Webster (16)
| Kevin Love (12)
| Luke Ridnour (6)
| Oracle Arena17,788
| 17–51
|- bgcolor="#ffcccc"
| 69
| March 16
| @ Utah
| 
| Kevin Love (22)
| Kevin Love (11)
| Kevin Love,Luke Ridnour (3)
| EnergySolutions Arena19,465
| 17–52
|- bgcolor="#ffcccc"
| 70
| March 18
| @ L.A. Lakers
| 
| Wesley Johnson (29)
| Kevin Love (13)
| Luke Ridnour (8)
| Staples Center18,997
| 17–53
|- bgcolor="#ffcccc"
| 71
| March 20
| Sacramento
| 
| Luke Ridnour (22)
| Darko Miličić (6)
| Kevin Love,Luke Ridnour (4)
| Target Center18,993
| 17–54
|- bgcolor="#ffcccc"
| 72
| March 24
| @ Dallas
| 
| Anthony Randolph (31)
| Anthony Randolph (11)
| Jonny Flynn (5)
| American Airlines Center20,296
| 17–55
|- bgcolor="#ffcccc"
| 73
| March 25
| @ Oklahoma City
| 
| Anthony Randolph (24)
| Anthony Randolph (15)
| Luke Ridnour (5)
| Oklahoma City Arena18,203
| 17–56
|- bgcolor="#ffcccc"
| 74
| March 27
| Boston
| 
| Michael Beasley (28)
| Anthony Tolliver (15)
| Luke Ridnour (8)
| Target Center19,178
| 17–57
|- bgcolor="#ffcccc"
| 75
| March 30
| Chicago
| 
| Kevin Love (16)
| Kevin Love (9)
| Jonny Flynn (5)
| Target Center19,207
| 17–58
|-

|- bgcolor="#ffcccc"
| 76
| April 1
| Miami
| 
| Martell Webster (22)
| Kevin Love (7)
| Luke Ridnour (9)
| Target Center19,096
| 17–59
|- bgcolor="#ffcccc"
| 77
| April 2
| @ Memphis
| 
| Michael Beasley (20)
| Nikola Peković (6)
| Michael Beasley,Wesley Johnson,Anthony Tolliver (4)
| FedExForum15,327
| 17–60
|- bgcolor="#ffcccc"
| 78
| April 5
| @ New Jersey
| 
| Anthony Randolph (20)
| Michael Beasley (11)
| Luke Ridnour (9)
| Prudential Center13,461
| 17–61
|- bgcolor="#ffcccc"
| 79
| April 6
| Phoenix
| 
| Michael Beasley (24)
| Michael Beasley (11)
| Luke Ridnour (5)
| Target Center16,113
| 17–62
|- bgcolor="#ffcccc"
| 80
| April 9
| @ Denver
| 
| Lazar Hayward,Martell Webster (15)
| Anthony Tolliver (7)
| Jonny Flynn (9)
| Pepsi Center19,155
| 17–63
|- bgcolor="#ffcccc"
| 81
| April 11
| @ Phoenix
| 
| Michael Beasley (26)
| Anthony Randolph,Anthony Tolliver (10)
| Luke Ridnour (9)
| US Airways Center17,485
| 17–64
|- bgcolor="#ffcccc"
| 82
| April 13
| Houston
| 
| Michael Beasley (34)
| Anthony Tolliver (13)
| Luke Ridnour (11)
| Target Center17,101
| 17–65
|-

Player statistics

Season

|-
| *
| 4 || 0 || 7.3 ||style="background:#000000;color:#01A951;"| .545 ||style="background:#000000;color:#01A951;"| .750 || .000 || .5 || .3 || .2 || .0 || 3.8
|-
| 
| 73 ||style="background:#000000;color:#01A951;"| 73 || 32.3 || .450 || .366 || .753 || 5.6 || 2.2 || .7 || .7 || 19.2
|-
| *
| 56 || 22 || 24.3 || .384 || .263 || .708 || 2.7 || 1.4 ||style="background:#000000;color:#01A951;"| 1.6 || .2 || 8.6
|-
| 
| 62 || 8 || 19.0 || .403 || .397 || .792 || 1.7 || 1.2 || .4 || .0 || 6.6
|-
| 
| 53 || 8 || 18.5 || .365 || .310 || .762 || 1.5 || 3.4 || .6 || .1 || 5.3
|-
| 
| 8 || 0 || 8.1 || .318 || .333 || .500 || .8 || .8 || .4 || .0 || 2.6
|-
| 
| 42 || 0 || 10.0 || .357 || .283 || .786 || 1.7 || .7 || .3 || .2 || 3.8
|-
| 
|style="background:#000000;color:#01A951;"| 79 || 63 || 26.2 || .397 || .356 || .696 || 3.0 || 1.9 || .7 || .7 || 9.0
|-
| *
| 39 || 1 || 8.6 || .435 || .000 || .500 || 2.5 || .2 || .5 || .6 || 2.7
|-
| 
| 73 ||style="background:#000000;color:#01A951;"| 73 ||style="background:#000000;color:#01A951;"| 35.8 || .470 || .417 || .850 ||style="background:#000000;color:#01A951;"| 15.2 || 2.5 || 0.6 || 0.4 ||style="background:#000000;color:#01A951;"| 20.2
|-
| 
| 69 || 69 || 24.4 || .469 || .000 || .557 || 5.2 || 1.5 || .8 ||style="background:#000000;color:#01A951;"| 2.0 || 8.8
|-
| 
| 65 || 11 || 13.6 || .517 || .000 || .763 || 3.0 || .4 || .3 || .5 || 5.5
|-
| *
| 23 || 3 || 20.1 || .498 || .000 || .703 || 5.2 || 1.1 || .8 || .7 || 11.7
|-
| 
| 71 || 66 || 30.4 || .468 || .440 ||style="background:#000000;color:#01A951;"| .883 || 2.8 ||style="background:#000000;color:#01A951;"| 5.4 || 1.2 || .1 || 11.8
|-
| 
| 37 || 8 || 19.2 || .402 || .359 || .733 || 1.5 || 3.0 || .7 || .1 || 7.2
|-
| 
| 65 || 4 || 21.0 || .450 || .409 || .802 || 4.5 || 1.3 || .4 || .4 || 6.7
|-
| 
| 46 || 1 || 23.8 || .447 || .417 || .770 || 3.2 || 1.2 || .6 || .2 || 9.8
|}

* – Stats with the Timberwolves.

Transactions

Trades

Free agents

Additions

Subtractions

References

Minnesota Timberwolves seasons
Minnesota
2010 in sports in Minnesota
2011 in sports in Minnesota